Jasper Hall (died 1778) was the speaker of the House of Assembly of Jamaica in 1778.

He was also the Receiver General of Jamaica and the owner of the Hectors River plantation.

See also
 List of speakers of the House of Assembly of Jamaica

References

External links 
https://www.ucl.ac.uk/lbs/person/view/2146653645

Year of birth missing
1778 deaths
Speakers of the House of Assembly of Jamaica
18th-century Jamaican people
Receiver Generals of Jamaica